Polese is a surname. Notable people with the surname include:

Giovanni Polese (1873–1952), Italian operatic baritone
Kim Polese (born 1961), American entrepreneur and technology executive
Tobia Polese (1865–1905), Italian painter